Corlăteni is a village in Rîșcani District, Moldova. In Corlăteni is located 9km north of Bălți the second civil international airport of Moldova and one of the two airports of Bălți: Bălți International Airport.

Notable people
 Valentin Guznac
 Valentin Todercan
 Iurie Țurcanu

References

Villages of Rîșcani District